Ottaviano de' Medici (1604–1629) was an Italian patrician, belonging to Napolitan branch of House of Medici. He was the first to hold the title of Prince of Ottajano.

Biography 
A member of a cadet branch of the Medici family (the one later called the Princes of Ottajano), he was the son of Alessandro de' Medici and his wife Delia di San Severino.

Marriage and issue 
He married Donna Diana Caracciolo. They had:
Francesca de' Medici; married Prince Filippo II Caetani (1620-1687)
Giuseppe de' Medici, 2nd Prince of Ottajano. He was the first to hold the title Duke of Sarno.
Domenico de' Medici

Ottaviano
17th-century Italian nobility
17th-century births
17th-century deaths
17th-century Neapolitan people